Richard Valentine Jago (1913 – 2 November 1983) was a politician and businessman in Cork city in Ireland. He was Secretary of the Cork Methodist Association in 1940, Lord Mayor of Cork from 1957 to 1958 when a member of the Cork Civic Party, and chairman of the Cork Chamber of commerce from 1964 to 1965. 

After the Civic Party's dissolution in 1966 he joined Fianna Fáil and was nominated to the Seanad by the Taoiseach after the 1977 general election, serving until 1981. He was an unsuccessful Fianna Fáil candidate at the November 1982 general election for the Cork South-Central constituency.

References

1913 births
1983 deaths
Local councillors in Cork (city)
Lord Mayors of Cork
Members of the 14th Seanad
Irish Methodists
Fianna Fáil senators
Nominated members of Seanad Éireann
Cork Civic Party politicians